The Insult is a 2017 Lebanese legal drama film directed by Ziad Doueiri and co-written by Doueiri and Joelle Touma. It was screened in the main competition section of the 74th Venice International Film Festival. At Venice, Kamel El Basha won the Volpi Cup for Best Actor. It was selected as the Lebanese entry for the Best Foreign Language Film and was nominated for the Oscar at the 90th Academy Awards.

The film tells the story of two men: Tony George Hanna (Adel Karam), a Lebanese Christian mechanic, and Yasser Salameh (Kamel El Basha), a Palestinian foreman, who are embroiled in a court case which causes political upheaval in an already unstable country.

Plot
Tony Hanna is a Lebanese Christian and devoted member of the Christian Party, with a pregnant wife, Shirine. Not wanting workers near his property when Shirine is there, Tony discovers contractors modifying the gutter on his balcony. Tony smashes the gutter, to which the worker Yasser Abdallah Salameh calls Tony a "fucking prick". Tony recognizes Yasser as a Palestinian refugee by his accent; he watches anti-Palestinian propaganda and wishes for all Palestinians to leave the country. Although the balcony was in violation of building codes and the workers were fixing it, Tony demands an apology for the "fucking prick" remark from the company. The employers bring Yasser to Tony's garage to apologize in person; but when Tony states he wishes Israeli statesman Ariel Sharon had exterminated all Palestinians, Yasser punches him instead, breaking two ribs.

Tony launches a lawsuit against Yasser, representing himself. However, when neither Yasser nor Tony can bring themselves to repeat what Tony said to Yasser about Sharon, the judge dismisses the case for inconclusive evidence. Enraged, Tony shouts the judge is corrupt and biased, and is removed from the courtroom but vows to appeal. He later collapses, and Shirine helps pull him up, later giving birth. The child is placed on life support, allegedly due to contractions Shirine experienced when she pulled up her husband and emotional shock at Yasser's assault. The case goes to retrial, with Yasser risking guilt of manslaughter if the child dies.

Wajdi Wehbe, a pro-Christian with memories of the Lebanese Civil War, becomes Tony's new representative, while Wajdi's own daughter, Nadine Wehbe, who has less memory of the war, takes Yasser's case. This time, Tony's comments about Sharon are placed before the court, with the argument that emotional distress provoked the assault; Shirine's history of miscarriages is also revealed. The arguments in the courtroom inflame memories of the civil war, leading to clashes in the streets between Christians and Muslims. With Wajdi underlining the importance of Sharon, Tony finds himself accused of Zionism and begins receiving death threats. Wajdi also characterizes Tony's comments as private and merely expressing a "wish", arguing this is not libel but freedom of thought.

In background research, Wajdi is surprised to learn Tony was born in Damour in 1970 and left in January 1976, a refugee of the Damour massacre when the city fell to Muslim and left-wing militants with help from Palestine Liberation Organisation units. Tony had not disclosed this to his own representation, and breaks down when Wajdi plays documentary footage of the event in the courtroom. Yasser and Tony later meet, and when Yasser says Christian suffering in the civil war was minimal compared to the Palestinians', Tony punches him and Yasser apologizes. Shirine and Tony's child recovers. Back at court, the judges find Yasser not guilty of assault. The pair appear to have reconciled by the end, exchanging a smile before parting.

Cast

Historical references

Each one of the two main characters is revealed to have been affected by a traumatic historical event in his youth: the Damour massacre in the case of Tony, and Black September in the case of Yasser. Moreover, there are references to Bachir Gemayel and Ariel Sharon, as prominent characters of the Lebanese civil war.

Release

Box office
The Insult has grossed $685,901 in Lebanon, $850,711 in Italy and $57,790 in the Netherlands for a total of $1.6 million. In Lebanon, it was released on 12 January 2018 in three theaters and grossed to $24,600 in its opening weekend, and was ranked 42nd. In its second weekend the film dropped 6% to $23,222, finishing 44th. In its third weekend, the film went up 162% and made $60,872, finishing 36th. In Italy it grossed to $203,161 on its opening weekend and in the Netherlands $26,871 in 22 theaters.

Critical reception
, the film holds an 87% approval rating on review aggregator website Rotten Tomatoes, based on 114 reviews with an average rating of 7.47 out of 10. The website's critical consensus reads, "The Insult uses its familiar courtroom drama framework to deliver a hard-hitting statement on modern Middle Eastern politics that's as gripping as it is thought-provoking." On Metacritic, the film has a weighted average score of 72 out of 100, based on 25 critics, indicating "generally favorable reviews".

Accolades

See also
List of submissions to the 90th Academy Awards for Best Foreign Language Film
List of Lebanese submissions for the Academy Award for Best Foreign Language Film

References

External links

2017 films
2017 drama films
2010s Arabic-language films
French drama films
Lebanese drama films
2010s French-language films
2010s legal drama films
Films directed by Ziad Doueiri
2010s French films